Xiaogan railway station is a station on Beijing–Guangzhou railway in Xiaonan District, Xiaogan, Hubei.

History
The station was established in 1901.

See also
 Xiaogan North railway station
 Xiaogan East railway station

References

Railway stations in Hubei
Stations on the Beijing–Guangzhou Railway
Railway stations in China opened in 1901